Matěj Helešic (born 12 November 1996) is a professional Czech football defender currently playing for SFC Opava in the Czech National Football League.

References

External links
 
 Matěj Helešic official international statistics
 

Czech footballers
1996 births
Living people
Czech National Football League players
Czech First League players
FC Baník Ostrava players
SK Dynamo České Budějovice players
SFC Opava players
Association football defenders